Kiwaia lapillosa is a moth in the family Gelechiidae. It was described by Edward Meyrick in 1924. It is found in New Zealand.

The wingspan is 15–16 mm. The forewings are dark slaty fuscous, irregularly sprinkled or mixed with whitish grey. The markings are cloudy, formed by absence of pale mixture. Spots represent the stigmata, with the plical rather obliquely before the first discal, a thick oblique bar from the costa terminating in these two and with an additional spot midway between the plical and the base. There is an angulated more or less distinct grey-whitish transverse shade at three-fourths. The hindwings are light grey.

References

Kiwaia
Moths described in 1924
Endemic fauna of New Zealand
Moths of New Zealand
Taxa named by Edward Meyrick
Endemic moths of New Zealand